UV Express (formerly known as FX, Metered Taxi, and GT Express) is a license to operate utility vehicles, particularly vans, as an alternative mode of public transportation in the Philippines. The term also refers to the vehicles themselves. This is one of the two types of share taxi services in the Philippines with the bus-like Jeepney. There is new law about transport franchising. Transport Cooperative thru the government office of the Cooperative Development authority.

History

In 1993, Toyota Motor Philippines introduced the third generation Tamaraw FX. This vehicle was designed and marketed as a smaller type of utility vehicle (as compared to the larger utility vehicles in countries like the United States). The Tamaraw FX could basically seat a driver and one passenger in front, three passengers in the second row, with a relatively large space left for luggage. This luggage space, however, has traditionally been used by operators to provide additional seating space, producing a rather limited legroom. This vehicle, as well as comparable offerings from other automobile manufacturers such as Mitsubishi Adventure, Isuzu Hi-Lander/Crosswind and in rarer instances, the Toyota Innova, would eventually be used as a form of public transport, colloquially referred to as the "FX".

Over time, the FX has been replaced by larger vehicles such as the Nissan Urvan, Hyundai Starex, Isuzu NHR i-Van, Foton View Transvan, and  Toyota HiAce. With these new vehicles, the luggage space has been fully removed to add seating space, with the same limited legroom as the first ones, which has been a cause for complaints of overloading.

Public transport model

UV Express follows the franchisee model and has more than 120 services in the Philippines including the (National Capital region). The country's Land Transportation Franchising and Regulatory Board serves as the owner of the franchise.

UV Express vans and compact MPVs are air conditioned, usually seat 10–18 
passengers and charge 2 Philippine pesos per kilometer (as of 2013). In Metro Manila, they have their own passenger terminals, mostly stops at central business districts such as Alabang (Starmall Alabang), Araneta City (Farmers Plaza) Ayala Alabang (Alabang Town Center), Bay City (SM Mall of Asia), Binondo (Divisoria), Bonifacio Global City (Market! Market!), Diliman (SM North EDSA and Trinoma), Makati CBD (Ayala Center), and Ortigas Center (Robinsons Galleria, SM Megamall, and Starmall EDSA-Shaw). Until it reaches to city centers such as Caloocan (Bonifacio Monument), Ermita (Liwasang Bonifacio), Marikina (Marikina Heights, Marikina Market, Parang, and Riverbanks Center), Novaliches (Fairview Terraces, Novaliches Market, Robinsons Novaliches, and SM City Fairview), Pasig (Pasig Market and San Joaquin), or industrial areas such as FTI Complex (Arca South) and Sucat, or its neighboring provinces in Greater Manila Area such as Bulacan, Cavite, Laguna, and Rizal.

The name UV stands for "Utility Vehicle".

References

Transportation in the Philippines
Public transportation in the Philippines